This is a list of medalists from the ICF Canoe Sprint World Championships in women's kayak.

K-1 200 m
Debuted: 1994.

K-1 500 m
Debuted: 1938. Not held: 1948. Resumed: 1950. 1938 distance was 600 m.

K-1 1000 m
Debuted: 1997.

Zenz competed for Saar at the 1954 championships though the official reports have her listed for West Germany.

K-1 5000 m
Debuted: 1989. Discontinued: 1993. Resumed: 2010.

K-2 200 m
Debuted: 1994.

K-2 500 m
Debuted: 1938. This is only one of two events held at every championships. 1938 distance was 600 m.

K-2 1000 m
Debuted: 1997.

K-2 5000 m
Debuted: 1989. Discontinued: 1993.

K-4 200 m
Debuted: 1994. Discontinued: 2009.

K-4 500 m
Debuted: 1963.

K-4 1000 m
Debuted: 2001. Discontinued: 2007.

Relay K-1 4 × 200 m
Debuted: 2009. Discontinued in 2014.

Mix K-2 200 m
Debuted: 2021

References
 
 
 

ICF Canoe Sprint World Championships women's kayak